In the Jaws of Life is a 1984 Yugoslav film directed by Rajko Grlić. It is based on a novel by Dubravka Ugrešić.

The film was released on VHS in the United States by Facets Video in November 1998.

Plot
Dunja (Gorica Popović), a television director is editing a TV series about Štefica Cvek (Vitomira Lončar), an introverted and unassuming office worker who lives in a world of romance novels and women's magazines, seeking out for a real man. Dunja's relationship with Sale (Miodrag Krivokapić), a literary critic and party ideologue, is facing a crisis, so she finds herself in a situation similar to that of her on-screen protagonist...

References

External links

1984 films
Croatian romantic drama films
1980s Croatian-language films
Yugoslav romantic drama films
Films directed by Rajko Grlić
Films based on Croatian novels
Films set in Zagreb